An ekkyklêma or eccyclema ("roll-out machine") was a wheeled platform rolled out through a skênê in ancient Greek theatre. It was used to bring interior scenes out into the sight of the audience. Some ancient sources suggest that it may have been revolved or turned.

It is mainly used in tragedies for revealing dead bodies, such as Hippolytus' dying body in the final scene of Euripides' play of the same name, or the corpse of Eurydice draped over the household altar in Sophocles' Antigone. Other uses include the revelation in Sophocles' Ajax of Ajax surrounded by the sheep he killed whilst under the delusion that they were Greeks. The ekkyklêma is also used in comedy to parody the tragic effect.  An example of this is in Aristophanes' Thesmophoriazusae when Agathon, portrayed as an effeminate, is wheeled onstage on an ekkyklêma to enhance the comic absurdity of the scene.

References

Sources
 Brockett, Oscar G. and Franklin J. Hildy. 2003. History of the Theatre. Ninth edition, International edition. Boston: Allyn and Bacon. .
 Csapo, Eric, and William J. Slater. 1994. The Context of Ancient Drama. Ann Arbor: U of Michigan P. .
 Davidson, John. 2005. "Theatrical Production." In Gregory (2005, 194–211).
 Goldhill, Simon. 2007. How to Stage Greek Tragedy Today. Chicago and London: U of Chicago P. .
 Gregory, Justina, ed. 2005. A Companion to Greek Tragedy. Blackwell Companions to the Ancient World ser. Malden, MA and Oxford: Blackwell. .
 Ley, Graham. 2007. The Theatricality of Greek Tragedy: Playing Space and Chorus. Chicago and London: U of Chicago P. .
 Rehm, Rush. 1992. Greek Tragic Theatre. Theatre Production Studies ser. London and New York: Routledge. .

Ancient Greek theatre